Robert A. McConnell (1914—2006) was an American physicist and parapsychologist.

McConnell was born in Pennsylvania in 1914, and studied at Carnegie Institute of Technology obtaining a B.S. in physics in 1935 and a Ph.D. from the University of Pittsburgh in 1947. He worked as a physicist at a U.S. Naval aircraft factory and at the Massachusetts Institute of Technology Radiation Laboratory. He also worked in radar moving target indication, iconoscope, and ultrasonic microwaves.

He earned a Doctor of Philosophy degree in engineering physics. McConnell was the first president of the Parapsychological Association and a Fellow of the American Psychological Society. He was Research Professor Emeritus of Biological Sciences at the University of Pittsburgh.

Selected works
Encounters with Parapsychology (1982)
Parapsychology and Self-Deception in Science (1983)
An Introduction to Parapsychology in the Context of Science (1983)
Parapsychology in Retrospect (1987)
Far Out in the New Age: The Subversion of Science by Cultural Communism (1995)
Joyride To Infinity: A Scientific Study of the Doomsday Literature (2000)
God.org Are You There?:  On the Deeper Meaning of ESP (2001)
Can We Win This War?: ISLAM (2002)

References

External links
 Robert A. McConnell, from the Parapsychological Association site
 Home page of R. A. McConnell

1914 births
2006 deaths
20th-century American physicists
Parapsychologists
Radar pioneers
University of Pittsburgh faculty
Carnegie Mellon University alumni
Massachusetts Institute of Technology staff